Grylloblatta bifratrilecta is a species of rock crawler in the family Grylloblattidae. It is found in North America, including Sonora Pass and Carson Pass in the Sierra Nevada.

Habitat and behavior
It lives in crevices at high altitudes, typically above . It is nocturnal and active mostly during winter months.

References

Further reading

 

Grylloblattidae
Articles created by Qbugbot
Insects described in 1953